The Philosophical Corps is science fiction novel by American writer Everett B. Cole. It was published in 1962 by Gnome Press in an edition of 4,000 copies.  The novel is a fix-up of stories that originally appeared in the magazine Astounding SF.

Plot summary
The novel concerns the adventures of the philosopher Commander A-Riman who attempts to re-educate aliens from whom he brooks no nonsense.

Contents
 "Fighting Philosopher"
 "Philosophical Corps"
 "The Players"

Sources

External links 
 

1962 American novels
American science fiction novels
Works originally published in Analog Science Fiction and Fact
Gnome Press books